Kim Bong-jin  (Hangul: 김봉진; Hanja: 金奉珍; born 18 July 1990 in Seoul) is a South Korean footballer.

He is a versatile midfielder and can play as defensive midfielder or central midfielder.

On 7 February 2017, Kim Bong-Jin scored the equalizer for Kitchee against Ulsan Hyundai in the 2017 AFC Champions League qualifying play-off. In December 2018, Kitchee announced that they will be loaning Bong-Jin to Hoang Anh Gia Lai FC.

At the end of the 2019 V.League 1, Hoang Anh Gia Lai FC terminated its contract with Bong Jin. 

Kim Bong-Jin joined Petaling Jaya City FC of the Malaysian Super League for the 2020 season, after visiting Malaysia on vacation.

Honours
Kitchee
Hong Kong Premier League: 2016–17, 2017–18
Hong Kong Senior Shield: 2016–17 
Hong Kong FA Cup: 2016–17, 2017–18
Hong Kong Sapling Cup: 2017–18
Hong Kong Community Cup: 2016–17, 2017–18

References

External links

Eurosport profile

1990 births
Living people
Association football midfielders
South Korean footballers
South Korean expatriate footballers
Gangwon FC players
Incheon United FC players
Gyeongnam FC players
Gwangju FC players
K League 2 players
K League 1 players
Kitchee SC players
Hong Kong Premier League players
Expatriate footballers in Hong Kong
South Korean expatriate sportspeople in Hong Kong
Hoang Anh Gia Lai FC players
V.League 1 players
Expatriate footballers in Vietnam
Petaling Jaya City FC players
Malaysia Super League players
Expatriate footballers in Malaysia
People from Seoul
Nakhon Si United F.C. players